Montorio nei Frentani (Campobassan dialect: Mundòrj) is a small town and comune in the province of Campobasso (Molise), in Southern Italy.

Churches
Santa Maria Assunta

References